Lane Ryo Hirabayashi, (October 17, 1952 – August 8, 2020) was an American historian who focused on the World War II internment of Japanese Americans. He recommended to use the term incarceration instead of internment.

Hirabayashi grew up in California and attended Sonoma State University for college and then got a PhD in Anthropology from the University of California at Berkeley. He became a professor at San Francisco State University.
 
From 2006-2017 Hirabayashi was a professor at University of California, Los Angeles, and director of their writer. He held the George and Sakaye Aratani Professorship, the first endowed chair to focus on the wartime confinement of Japanese Americans.

In his book, A Principled Stand: Gordon Hirabayashi v. the United States, Hirabayashi discussed his uncle Gordon Hirabayashi's major legal case, Hirabayashi v. United States. Gordon Hirabayashi had resisted the internment (incarceration) and his case went to the U.S. Supreme Court.

References

1952 births
2020 deaths
American historians
University of California, Los Angeles faculty
American people of Japanese descent
American academics of Japanese descent
American writers of Japanese descent
Sonoma State University alumni
University of California, Berkeley alumni
People from Mill Valley, California